Michael Barnett, better known by his stage name Big Mike (born January 23, 1972) is an American rapper from the southern United States. Native of New Orleans, Louisiana – he was partially raised in both New Orleans and Houston, Texas.

Discography

Studio albums
Somethin' Serious (1994) #40 Billboard 200; #4 R&B/Hip Hop
Still Serious (1997) #16 Billboard 200; #3 R&B/ Hip Hop
Hard to Hit (1999)#63 Billboard 200; #13 R&B/ Hip Hop
Nawlins Phats (2005)
Keep It Playa (2006)
Serious as Can Be (2009)
Ridah Music Vol.1 (The Invitation) (2009)
The Reintroduction (2010)
Bayou Classic – Love.Faith.Honor.Loyalty (2011)
Fast Boy Music (2013)
O.G. Big Mike (2017)
Finish The Job (2020)

Collaboration albums
Convicts with Convicts (1991)
Till Death Do Us Part with Geto Boys (1993)

Mixtapes
Full Circle (2011)

Guest appearances
”Sons of the Boulevard”, from the album We Will No Longer Retreat Into Darkness (by The Mighty Rhino, also featuring Illvibe) (2018)

References 

Year of birth unknown
Living people
Gangsta rappers
American male rappers
Rappers from New Orleans
Rap-A-Lot Records artists
Southern hip hop musicians
21st-century American male musicians
African-American male rappers
21st-century American rappers
1971 births
21st-century African-American musicians
20th-century African-American people